Zebrasoma rostratum, the longnose surgeonfish or black tang, is a marine reef tang in the fish family Acanthuridae. Zebrasoma rostratum is found in the South Pacific off the coasts of the Society Islands, Marquesas Islands, Line Islands, Tuamoto Islands to the Pitcairn Islands.

References

External links
 Black Tang (Zebrasoma rostratum)

Acanthuridae
Fish described in 1875
Taxa named by Albert Günther